Baloň is a village and municipality in the Dunajská Streda District in the Trnava Region of south-west Slovakia.

Geography
It has a population of about 756 people.

History
In the late of 9th century, the territory of Baloň became part of the Kingdom of Hungary.
In historical records the village was first mentioned in 1252. It was part of Győr County.
After the Austro-Hungarian army disintegrated in November 1918, Czechoslovak troops occupied the area, later acknowledged internationally by the Treaty of Trianon. Between 1938 and 1945 Baloň once more became part of Miklós Horthy's Hungary through the First Vienna Award. From 1945 until the Velvet Divorce, it was part of Czechoslovakia. Since then it has been part of Slovakia.

Genealogical resources

The records for genealogical research are available at the state archive "Statny Archiv in Bratislava, Slovakia"
 Roman Catholic church records (births/marriages/deaths): 1734-1898 (parish A)
 Lutheran church records (births/marriages/deaths): ????-???? (parish in Győr, Hungary)
 Reformated church records (births/marriages/deaths): 1810-1902 (parish B)
 Census records 1869 of Balon are not available at the state archive.

See also
 List of municipalities and towns in Slovakia

References

External links
Surnames of living people in Balon

Villages and municipalities in Dunajská Streda District
Hungarian communities in Slovakia